The 2017 Calgary municipal election was held on October 16, 2017, to elect a mayor, councillors to the city council, trustees to the Calgary Board of Education, and trustees to the Calgary Catholic School District. 

From 1968 to 2013, provincial legislation required every municipality to hold elections every three years. The 28th Alberta Legislature introduced the Election Accountability Amendment Act (Bill 7) which among other reforms to provincial and municipal elections, amended the Local Authorities Election Act to extend the terms of local authorities including municipalities and school boards from three years to four years.

In addition, council members are now referred to as councillors, whereas they used the title "Alderman" prior to 2013. Advanced voting began on October 4 and ran through until October 11.

The voter turnout was 58.1%, the highest the turnout had been in over four decades.

Candidates
X = incumbent

Mayor

City council

Ward 1

Ward 2

Ward 3

Ward 4

Ward 5

Ward 6

Ward 7

Ward 8

Ward 9

Ward 10

Ward 11

Ward 12

Ward 13

Ward 14

Issues

Campaign finance transparency
According to a 2013 Calgary Herald article, campaign finance transparency had become a topic of interest with most candidates making their donor lists available before the election. One veteran candidate who raised $78,000 in contributions in the 2010 election preferred to file according to legal requirements by filing disclosure of donations with city hall at the end of the year. By late summer 2017, campaign finance transparency was an issue again with the establishment of a political action committee (PAC), a third-party organization that is not required to reveal the identity of its donors. PACS are commonly used in the United States to pool campaign contributions to target candidates. Hadyn Place, Director of Alberta Can't Wait—one of Alberta's "unite the right" movement organizations—explained to CBC journalists that Save Calgary is targeting incumbents Mayor Naheed Nenshi, and councillors Druh Farrell, Evan Woolley, Gian-Carlo Carra, Diane Colley-Urquhart because "We feel that there are good candidates running against those current city councillors and we don't like their voting records, and their priorities, we feel, are out of step with everyday Calgarians' priorities."

CBC News likened Calgary's "relatively lawless" finance rules for municipal elections, to the "wild west". Municipal government election candidates can accept donations from corporations, unions and individuals and there is "no cap on how much candidates can spend". This contrasts with federal and provincial elections where candidates are not allowed to accept corporate and union donations. At the federal level, candidates face a hard cap on campaign spending based on the size of their riding, and the laws are strictly enforced. According to Alberta Municipal Affairs, the Alberta government of plans to add amendments to existing municipal elections laws, possibly in 2018. as early as next year. Jack Lucas, a professor of political science at the University of Calgary told CBC News that Alberta will "likely curb donation limits and put a cap on campaign spending". Lucas said, "Clearer disclosure rules for third-party advertising would make third-party campaigns like Save Calgary more transparent and less controversial."

References

Sources

External links
 The City of Calgary: Elections 2017

2017 Alberta municipal elections
2017
2010s in Calgary